Mudichur is a Residential Locality in Chennai Metropolitan Area in Tamil Nadu.

References

Further reading
 
 
 
 
 
 
 

Cities and towns in Chennai district